Manipal College of Dental Sciences may refer to:

 Manipal College of Dental Sciences, Manipal; founded in 1965
 Manipal College of Dental Sciences, Mangalore; founded in 1987